Elliot Grainge is a British record executive. He is the founder and CEO of 10K Projects, an independent record label. His label represents hip hop and rap artists including Trippie Redd, Tekashi 6ix9ine, and Iann Dior. Grainge is the son of Universal Music Group executive Lucian Grainge. and is engaged to social media personality and model Sofia Richie.

Early life and education
Grainge was raised in the United Kingdom. The son of Universal Music Group CEO Lucian Grainge, he grew up as an insider in the music industry. In 2009, Grainge moved to the United States.

He attended Northeastern University in Boston. As a student, Grainge ran a bottle service club promotion business for dance and hip hop venues in Boston. After graduating from Northeastern with a bachelor's degree, Grainge moved to Los Angeles, where his family lived.

Career
Grainge started the independent record label 10K Projects in 2016 in Los Angeles. His label has signed musicians such as rappers Iann Dior, Trippie Redd, and Tekashi 6ix9ine, as well as the beach pop band  Surfaces. Grainge discovered some of the artists for his label on SoundCloud; he has called the online distribution platform a "cheat sheet" for finding new talent. Artists signed to Grainge's 10K Projects are distributed by Universal Music Group's Caroline Records.

In October 2019, Grainge's 10K Projects entered a joint venture deal with music producer Taz Taylor's creative collective Internet Money Records. It formed 10K Together, a charitable division of 10K Projects focused on donating to racial justice charities and black-owned businesses, in June 2020. Grainge's company acquired music label Homemade Projects in February 2022.

As of December 2019, his label's artists have received 18 gold and 8 platinum/multi platinum singles.

Personal life
Grainge became engaged to social media personality and model Sofia Richie on April 20, 2022. He lives in Los Angeles.

References 

Year of birth missing (living people)
Living people